Lee Lai (born 1993) is a transgender, Asian-Australian cartoonist who presently lives in Canada. In 2021, the National Book Foundation named her an honoree of their 5 Under 35 award for her debut graphic novel, Stone Fruit. The following year, Stone Fruit was a finalist for the Barbara Gittings Literature Award, Lambda Literary Award for Graphic Novel/Comics, and Los Angeles Times Book Prize for Graphic Novel/Comics, among other awards.

Biography 
Lai was born in 1993 in Melbourne and has a sister, with whom she is close. She presently lives in Montreal. 

Lai became interested in comics because of mild dyslexia, which made reading traditional novels difficult. Her short story comics have been published in The New Yorker, The Lifted Brow, Room Magazine, and Everyday Feminism.

Lai is transgender and homosexual.

Awards and honours

Publications 

 Stone Fruit (2021)

Contributions 

 Heartwood: Non-binary Tales of Sylvan Fantasy, edited by Joamette Gil (2019)
 McSweeney's #62: The Queer Fiction Issue, edited by Patrick Cottrell, Dave Eggers (Editor), and Claire Boyle (Editor) (2020)

Illustrations 

 A Head-Heart Start For Life: Creative Mindful Discoveries for Young Children, written by Janet Etty-Leal (2019)

References 

Living people
Cartoonists from Melbourne
Australian cartoonists
1993 births
Transgender writers
Australian LGBT novelists